The District of Columbia participated in the 2020 United States presidential election with the other 50 states on Tuesday, November 3. District of Columbia voters chose electors to represent them in the Electoral College via a popular vote, pitting the Republican Party's nominee, incumbent President Donald Trump, and running mate Vice President Mike Pence against Democratic Party nominee, former Vice President Joe Biden, and his running mate California Senator Kamala Harris. The District of Columbia has three electoral votes in the Electoral College. Prior to the election, Biden was considered to be all but certain to win D.C. The nation's capital is overwhelmingly Democratic and has voted for the Democratic nominee by massive margins in every presidential election it has participated in, ever since it was first granted electors by the passage of the Twenty-third Amendment in 1961. Biden's 86.75-point margin of victory was virtually identical to that secured by Hillary Clinton in 2016. Nevertheless, the District shifted very slightly to the right compared with the previous election, making Biden the first non-incumbent Democrat since 1988 to win D.C. by a smaller margin than in the previous cycle. Along with seven states, it was one of just eight electoral-vote areas where Trump improved on his 2016 margins.

Primary elections
The District of Columbia held primary elections on June 2, 2020.

Republican primary
Donald Trump ran unopposed in the Republican primary, and thus received all of the district's 19 delegates to the 2020 Republican National Convention.

Democratic primary

General election

Final predictions

Polling

Graphical summary

Aggregate polls

Polls

Results

Results by ward

Notes

See also
 United States presidential elections in the District of Columbia
 2020 District of Columbia elections
 2020 United States elections
 2020 United States presidential election
 2020 Democratic Party presidential primaries
 2020 Republican Party presidential primaries

References

Further reading

External links
 
 
  (Affiliate of the U.S. League of Women Voters)
 
 

District of Columbia
2020
Presidential